Mohammadabad (also Romanized as Moḩammadābād; also known as Mohammad Abad Hoomeh and Moḩammadābād Ḩūmeh) is a village in Mohammadabad Rural District, in the Central District of Zarand County, Kerman Province, Iran. At the 2006 census, its population was 1,728, in 448 families.

References 

Populated places in Zarand County